Volodymyr Borysovych Tsytkin (born 1 August 1966) is a retired Soviet and Ukrainian footballer who played as a goalkeeper and current football manager of Khust.

Career
After retiring in 2002, he worked for various clubs as a goalkeeping coach.

External links
 
 
 
 Tsytkin at allplayers.in.ua

1966 births
Living people
Footballers from Kyiv
Soviet footballers
Ukrainian footballers
Association football goalkeepers
FC Ros Bila Tserkva players
FC Zorya Luhansk players
FC Bukovyna Chernivtsi players
FC Nyva Vinnytsia players
Maccabi Acre F.C. players
FC Spartak Ivano-Frankivsk players
FC Enerhetyk Burshtyn players
FC Obolon-Brovar Kyiv players
FC Obolon-2 Kyiv players
Soviet First League players
Soviet Second League players
Ukrainian Premier League players
Ukrainian First League players
Ukrainian Second League players
Ukrainian expatriate footballers
Expatriate footballers in Israel
Ukrainian expatriate sportspeople in Israel
Ukrainian football managers
FC Nyva Vinnytsia managers
FC Khust managers
Ukrainian Second League managers
Ukrainian expatriate football managers
Expatriate football managers in Russia
Ukrainian expatriate sportspeople in Russia
Expatriate football managers in Moldova
Ukrainian expatriate sportspeople in Moldova